Richeze is a surname. Notable people with the surname include:

Adrián Richeze (born 1989), Argentine cyclist
Mauro Richeze (born 1985), Argentine cyclist
Maximiliano Richeze (born 1983), Argentine cyclist
Roberto Richeze (born 1981), Argentine cyclist and brother of Adrián, Mauro, and Maximiliano